The Fortunes of Perkin Warbeck:  A Romance is an 1830 historical novel by Mary Shelley about the life of Perkin Warbeck.  The book takes a Yorkist point of view and proceeds from the conceit that Perkin Warbeck died in childhood and the supposed impostor was indeed Richard of Shrewsbury.  Henry VII of England is repeatedly described as a "fiend" who hates Elizabeth of York, his wife and Richard's sister, and the future Henry VIII, mentioned only twice in the novel, is a vile youth who abuses dogs.  Her preface establishes that records of the Tower of London, as well as the histories of Edward Hall, Raphael Holinshed, and Francis Bacon, the letters of Sir John Ramsay to Henry VII that are printed in the Appendix to John Pinkerton's History of Scotland establish this as fact. Each chapter opens with a quotation.  The entire book is prefaced with a quotation in French by  Georges Chastellain and Jean Molinet.

Plot and themes
In this novel, Mary Shelley returned to The Last Mans message that an idealistic political system is impossible without an improvement in human nature. This historical novel, influenced by those of Sir Walter Scott, fictionalises the exploits of Perkin Warbeck, a pretender to the throne of King Henry VII who claimed to be Richard, Duke of York, the second son of King Edward IV.

Shelley believed that Warbeck really was Richard and had escaped from the Tower of London. She endows his character with elements of Percy Shelley, portraying him sympathetically as "an angelic essence, incapable of wound", who is led by his sensibility onto the political stage. She seems to have identified herself with Richard's wife, Lady Katherine Gordon, who survives after her husband's death by compromising with his political enemies.

Lady Gordon stands for the values of friendship, domesticity and equality; through her, Mary Shelley offers a female alternative to the masculine power politics that destroy Richard, as well as the typical historical narrative which only relates those events.

Shelley also creates a strong female character in the round-faced, half-Moor, half-Fleming, Monina de Faro, Richard's adoptive sister, whom Robin Clifford demands as his wife.  Monina is a versatile young lady who acts as decoy, messenger, and military organizer, in addition to her close friendship with both Richard and Katherine.  Robin Clifford epitomizes mixed loyalties—an old friend descended from Lancastrians, who is constantly divided against himself.  Stephen Frion, secretary to Henry VII and betrayed by him, is an elder foil, whose loyalties shift back and forth dependent on Henry's grace, whereas Clifford's wavering is based on genuine emotion.

The book opens immediately after the Battle of Bosworth on August 22, 1485 (a scanning error in the Dodo Press 2000 edition gives the date as 1415).  Three knights are fleeing from the battle, Sir Henry Stafford, Lord Lovel, and Edmund Plantagenet, although the latter two are not identified until they split from Stafford and arrive at a church.  All three are members of the defeated Yorkist contingency.

With the aid of John de la Pole, the Earl of Lincoln, Lovel and Edmund are involved in spiriting away Richard, Duke of York into the hands of Mynheer Jahn Warbeck, a Flemish moneylender who had previously housed him and pretended that Richard was his deceased son, Perkin Warbeck.  This is not considered safe enough for the youth at the present time, so it is arranged for Richard to go with Madeline de Faro, Warbeck's 25-year-old sister.  Madeline is married to mariner Hernan de Faro, and the two have a daughter named Monina, and Richard and Monina develop a strong sibling bond, Richard aware he could never marry a commoner.  It is she who rescues and nurses him back to health after his first taste of battle in the Granada War.

Characters

Richard of Shrewsbury, 1st Duke of York, son of King Edward IV and nephew of King Richard III 
Perkin Warbeck, deceased son of Mynheer Jahn Warbeck, and alias of Richard
Lady Katherine Gordon, Richard's wife, and cousin of James, daughter of Lord Huntley
Monina de Faro, adoptive sister of Richard and close friend to Lady Katherine
Edmund Plantagenet, bastard son of Richard III, cousin and close ally of Richard
Stephen Frion, French-born secretary of Henry VII and opportunistic enemy/ally of Richard
Sir Robert "Robin" Clifford, alternate friend/betrayer of Richard
James IV of Scotland, friend to Richard
Madeline Warbeck de Faro, wife of Hernan de Faro, mother of Monina, adoptive mother of Richard, and sister of Mynheer Jahn Warbeck
Hernan de Faro, a Moorish sailor converted to Christianity, husband of Madeline, father of Monina, adoptive father of Richard
Henry VII of England, Earl of Richmond and first Tudor King of England
Elizabeth of York, wife of Henry VII and sister of Richard
Elizabeth Woodville, mother of Richard and former queen: widow of Edward IV
Jane Shore, mistress of Edward IV, Richard's father
Edward Plantagenet, 17th Earl of Warwick, son of George, Duke of Clarence, prisoner of Henry VII
John de la Poole, Earl of Lincoln
Lady Margaret Brampton, ally of Richard
Sir Edward Brampton, her husband
Arthur, Prince of Wales, eldest son of Henry VII and Elizabeth of York
Margaret Tudor, eldest daughter of Henry and Elizabeth
Prince Harry, second son of Henry and Elizabeth
Thomas Grey, 1st Marquess of Dorset, son of Elizabeth Woodville by her first marriage 
Thomas Stanley, 1st Earl of Derby 
John de Vere, 13th Earl of Oxford
Henry Stafford, 2nd Duke of Buckingham
Lord Lovel
John Morton, Bishop of Ely, close ally of Henry VII
Richard Fox, Bishop of Exeter, Bath and Wells, Durham, and Winchester, ally of Henry VII 
Christopher Urswick
Richard Simon
Lambert Simnel
Mynheer Jahn Warbeck, father of Perkin Warbeck
Charles the Bold
Isabella I of Castile
Ferdinand II of Aragon
Louis XI of France
Jasper Tudor, 1st Duke of Bedford 
Sir Thomas Broughton
Mary of Burgundy
Lord Barry, ally of Richard
Sir William Stanley, ally of Richard
Meiler Trangmar, assassin disguised as a monk
Maurice FitzGerald, 9th Earl of Desmond, ally of Richard
John Lavallan, Lord Mayor of Cork and ally of Richard
John Atwater, previous and subsequent Lord Mayor of Cork, ally of Richard
Edward Stafford, 3rd Duke of Buckingham
Lord Huntley, father of Katherine
John Ramsay, 1st Lord Bothwell, Laird of Kilmaine and spy of Henry VII at the court of James IV
Alexander Stewart, 2nd Earl of Buchan, ally of Ramsay
Lord Broke
Margaret of York, Richard's aunt
Gerald FitzGerald, 8th Earl of Kildare
Thomas FitzGerald of Laccagh
Martin Schwartz
René of Anjou
John Radcliffe, 9th Baron FitzWalter
Don Rodrigo Ponce de Leon, Marquess of Cadiz
Bartholomew Diaz
Sire de Beverem
Boabdil el Chico
El Zagal
El Zogoybi
Count de Tendilla
Almoradi Gomelez
Charles VIII of France
Anne of Brittany
Hubert Burgh
Sir James Keating, prior of Kilmainham and ally of Richard 
Richard Fitzroy
Sir Simon Mountford
Sir Thomas Thwaites
Sir Robert Ratcliffe
Sir Richard Lessey
William Worseley, Dean of St. Paul's
Master William Barley
Baron George Neville. ally of Richard
Maximilian I, Holy Roman Emperor
Adam Floyer
Lord William Dawbenny
Thomas Cressenor
Thomas Astwood
William Richford
Thomas Poyns
Doctor William Sutton
Robert Langborne
Sir William Lessey,
Gilbert Dawbenny, brother of William
Sir Edward Lisle
John Tate (Lord Mayor of London)
Thomas Howard, 3rd Duke of Norfolk
Sir John Digby, Lieutenant of the Tower of London
Sir John Peachy
Lord Astley 
Sir Patrick Hamilton of Kincavil, ally of Richard
Mary Boyd, suitor of James 
Lady Jane Kennedy, suitor of James
Lord Audley
Anne de Mowbray, 8th Countess of Norfolk
John de Mowbray, 4th Duke of Norfolk
Earl of Errol
Earl of Douglas
Sir Thomas Todd
Sir Roderick-de-Lalane
Andrew Stewart, Bishop of Moray
Master Heron, lieutenant of Richard chosen by Monina de Faro
Master Skelton, lieutenant of Richard chosen by Monina de Faro
Master Treireife, lieutenant of Richard chosen by Monina de Faro
William Courtenay, 1st Earl of Devon, ally of Henry VII
Adam Wicherly
Mat Oldcraft
John de Vere, 15th Earl of Oxford
Empson
Garthe
John Cheney 
Sir Harry de Vere
Clim of Tregothius
Swartz (son of Martin)
Clym of the Lyn, a forester and ally of Richard
Sir Hugh Luttrell, Lancastrian ordered to take Richard prisoner
Long Roger, prisoner in the Tower of London who aids in Edward and Richard's escape attempt
Dame Madge, Long Roger's wife (unseen character)
Abel Blewet, prisoner in the Tower of London who aids in Edward and Richard's escape attempt, a murderous near-dwarf
Mat Strangeways, prisoner in the Tower of London who aids in Edward and Richard's escape attempt, a drunk
Master Astwood, prisoner in the Tower of London who aids in Edward and Richard's escape attempt, a miser

in flashbacks
Richard III of England, Richard's paternal uncle, who allegedly orchestrated his murder
Anthony Woodville, 2nd Earl Rivers, Richard's maternal uncle, whose death was orchestrated by Richard III
Edward V of England, Richard's older brother
George Plantagenet, 1st Duke of Clarence, Richard's paternal uncle, whose death was orchestrated by Richard III
Sir James Tirell, vassal of Richard III whom he was alleged to have hired to kill Richard 
John Dighton, servant of Tirell and alleged murderer of Richard
James III of Scotland, father of James IV
Thomas de Mowbray, 1st Duke of Norfolk
Roger de Clifford, 5th Baron de Clifford
Lady Maud Clifford
Mistress Margery, Richard's governess

Quotations
Each chapter opens with a quotation, sometimes two.  The quotations come from the following authors:

Edmund Spenser, (I: 1, 5, 6, 15; II: 15; III: 10, 13, 15, 20)
William Shakespeare (usually spelled "Shakspeare"), (I: 2, 3, 4, 11, 13, 17; II: 2, 3, 4, 6, 8, 9, 10, 13, 17, III: 3, 5, 6, 7, 8, 9, 12, 16, 17, Conclusion)
Percy Bysshe Shelley, (I: 5, 12; II: 5, 9, III: 2, 21)
Francis Beaumont and John Fletcher, (I: 7)
Old Ballad, (I: 8, 9; III: 9)
Lord Byron, (I: 9; III: 18)
Homer's Hymn to Mercury, (I: 10)
The Cyclops [ Percy Bysshe Shelley ], (I: 10)
Thomas Moore, (I: 12; III: 4)
Geoffrey Chaucer, (I: 14)
Samuel Taylor Coleridge, (I: 16, 18)
John Ford, (I: 17; II: 9, 14, 18; III: 1, 6)
The Heir of Lynne,  (II: 1)
Two Noble Kinsmen, [John Fletcher and William Shakespeare] (II: 7, III: 14, 19) 
The Woeful Lamentation of Jane Shore, (II: 8)
Ben Jonson,  (II: 16)
Friedrich Schiller's Wallenstein (III: 1, 8)

Notes

Bibliography
Bennett, Betty T. "The Political Philosophy of Mary Shelley's Historical novels: Valperga and Perkin Warbeck". The Evidence of the Imagination. Eds. Donald H. Reiman, Michael C. Jaye, and Betty T. Bennett. New York: New York University Press, 1978.
Brewer, William D. "William Godwin, Chivalry, and Mary Shelley's The Fortunes of Perkin Warbeck".  Papers on Language and Literature 35.2 (Spring 1999): 187–205. Rpt. on bnet.com. Retrieved on 20 February 2008.
Bunnell, Charlene E. "All the World's a Stage": Dramatic Sensibility in Mary Shelley's Novels. New York: Routledge, 2002. .
Garbin, Lidia. "Mary Shelley and Walter Scott: The Fortunes of Perkin Warbeck and the Historical Novel". Mary Shelley's Fiction: From Frankenstein to Falkner. Eds. Michael Eberle-Sinatra and Nora Crook. New York: Macmillan; St. Martin's, 2000.
Hopkins, Lisa. "The Self and the Monstrous". Iconoclastic Departures: Mary Shelley after "Frankenstein": Essays in Honor of the Bicentenary of Mary Shelley's Birth. Eds. Syndy M. Conger, Frederick S. Frank, and Gregory O'Dea. Madison, NJ: Fairleigh Dickinson University Press, 1997. 
Lynch, Deidre. "Historical novelist". The Cambridge Companion to Mary Shelley. Ed. Esther Schor. Cambridge: Cambridge University Press, 2003. .
Sites, Melissa. "Chivalry and Utopian Domesticity in Mary Shelley's The Fortunes of Perkin Warbeck". European Romantic Review 16.5 (2005): 525–43.
Spark, Muriel. Mary Shelley. London: Cardinal, 1987. .
Wake, Ann M Frank. "Women in the Active Voice: Recovering Female History in Mary Shelley's Valperga and Perkin Warbeck". Iconoclastic Departures: Mary Shelley after "Frankenstein". Essays in Honor of the Bicentenary of Mary Shelley's Birth. Ed. Syndy M. Conger, Frederick S. Frank, and Gregory O'Dea. Madison, NJ: Farleigh Dickinson University Press, 1997. .

External links

The Fortunes of Perkin Warbeck (1830), Volume II from the Internet Archive
The Fortunes of Perkin Warbeck (1830), Volume III from the Internet Archive
The Fortunes of Perkin Warbeck (1857) from Google Books

1830 British novels
Novels set in the 15th century
British historical novels
Novels by Mary Shelley
Perkin Warbeck